The Royal Brompton and Harefield NHS Foundation Trust was an NHS foundation trust which ran the Royal Brompton Hospital in Kensington and Harefield Hospital in Hillingdon, London, England.

The Trust has been centrally involved in a long running row over attempts to reduce the number of children's heart surgery units in England following the enquiry into deaths of children at Bristol Royal Infirmary.  It was agreed in July 2012 to end children's surgery at the Brompton, Leeds and Leicester. after an unsuccessful judicial review action by the Trust. However, in June 2013 Jeremy Hunt suspended this plan and asked NHS England to reconsider and to produce a new report at the end of July, a report which has (in November 2013)  yet to appear.

It was named by the Health Service Journal as one of the top hundred NHS trusts to work for in 2015.  At that time it had 3125 full-time equivalent staff and a sickness absence rate of 2.49%. 92% of staff recommend it as a place for treatment and 81% recommended it as a place to work.

The trust plans a merger with Guy's and St Thomas' NHS Foundation Trust which could take place by April 2021.  All the services would move from Chelsea to Guy’s Westminster Bridge site and the Royal Brompton site could potentially be sold for a billion pounds. The Harefield Hospital services would remain in Uxbridge.

Private patients
About 12% of the trust's income came from private patients in 2014.  The Brompton Private Patient Unit has opened an outpatients clinic in Harley Street.

See also
 Healthcare in London
 List of NHS trusts

References

Defunct NHS trusts